Lemniscus can refer to: 
 Lemniscus (anatomy)
 In mathematics, a lemniscate